Lipnitsa is a rural locality (a khutor) in Belyayevsky Selsoviet Rural Settlement, Konyshyovsky District, Kursk Oblast, Russia. Population:

Geography 
The khutor is located on the Vandarets River (a left tributary of the Svapa River), 42.5 km from the Russia–Ukraine border, 81 km north-west of Kursk, 18 km north-west of the district center – the urban-type settlement Konyshyovka, 5.5 km from the selsoviet center – Belyayevo.

 Climate
Lipnitsa has a warm-summer humid continental climate (Dfb in the Köppen climate classification).

Transport 
Lipnitsa is located 37.5 km from the federal route  Ukraine Highway, 59 km from the route  Crimea Highway, 26 km from the route  (Trosna – M3 highway), 23 km from the road of regional importance  (Fatezh – Dmitriyev), 18.5 km from the road  (Konyshyovka – Zhigayevo – 38K-038), 10 km from the road  (Dmitriyev – Beryoza – Menshikovo – Khomutovka), 16 km from the road  (Lgov – Konyshyovka), 3.5 km from the road of intermunicipal significance  (Kashara – Gryady), 6 km from the road  (Konyshyovka – Makaro-Petrovskoye, with the access road to the villages of Belyayevo and Chernicheno), 16 km from the nearest railway halt Grinyovka (railway line Navlya – Lgov-Kiyevsky).

The rural locality is situated 87.5 km from Kursk Vostochny Airport, 172 km from Belgorod International Airport and 289 km from Voronezh Peter the Great Airport.

References

Notes

Sources

Rural localities in Konyshyovsky District